Petr Škrabálek was a Czechoslovakian luger who competed during the early 1960s. He won the bronze medal in the men's doubles event at the 1962 FIL World Luge Championships in Krynica, Poland.

References

Czechoslovak male lugers
Living people
Year of birth missing (living people)
Place of birth missing (living people)